Aaron Berzel (born 29 May 1992) is a German professional footballer who plays as a defender for Rot-Weiß Oberhausen.

Career
Berzel played youth football for later 1899 Hoffenheim and VfL Wolfsburg. At Holstein Kiel he made his breakthrough in senior football. He joined the club in 2011, and made 21 appearances in the Regionalliga Nord in the 2011–12 season, before his former Wolfsburg youth coach, Christian Benbennek, brought him to 3. Liga side SV Babelsberg 03. Babelsberg were relegated in the 2012–13 season, so Berzel left the club, signing for SV Darmstadt 98.

On 18 January 2022, Berzel signed with SC Verl. On 12 January 2023, his contract with SC Verl was terminated by mutual consent.

On 31 January 2023, Berzel signed with Rot-Weiß Oberhausen in Regionalliga West.

Career statistics

Club

References

External links
 
 

1992 births
Living people
Association football defenders
German footballers
Holstein Kiel players
SV Babelsberg 03 players
SV Elversberg players
SV Darmstadt 98 players
TSV 1860 Munich players
Türkgücü München players
FC Viktoria Köln players
SC Verl players
Rot-Weiß Oberhausen players
2. Bundesliga players
3. Liga players
Regionalliga players
Sportspeople from Heidelberg
Footballers from Baden-Württemberg